This is a list of Supreme Court of the United States cases in the area of copyright law. In the United States Constitution, the Copyright Clause in Article 1, Section 8 endows Congress with the power to create a copyright system. To avoid individual states' attempts at creating their own copyright systems, Congress passed the Copyright Act of 1790, based on Great Britain's Statute of Anne. Over the decades since, copyright in the United States has become a more complicated system with longer terms and more tests, and has been the subject of many decisions by the Court.

The Supreme Court was the source of a number of concepts in the field, including fair use, the idea-expression divide, the useful articles or separability doctrine, and the uncopyrightability of federal documents.

This list is a list solely of United States Supreme Court decisions about applying copyright law. Not all Supreme Court decisions are ultimately influential and, as in other fields, not all important decisions are made at the Supreme Court level. Many federal courts issue rulings that are significant or come to be influential, but those are outside the scope of this list.

Because they share a clause of the Constitution and much the same justifications, there is considerable overlap between patent and copyright jurisprudence. As such, patent cases may appear in this list if they make their connections to copyright explicit in the opinions.

19th century

20th century

21st century

Forthcoming cases  
The Supreme Court has granted certiorari, but not yet issued a decision, in the following case:

Dissents to denials of certiorari 
When the Court refuses to hear a case, justices are entitled to write dissents to that denial of certiorari.

Further research 
 Raza Panjwani, "Supreme Court Copyright Index"—A post listing Supreme Court copyright jurisprudence, organized by justice. Last updated in 2014.

See also
 List of United States Supreme Court patent case law
 List of United States Supreme Court trademark case law

Copyright law
Copyright
 Supreme Court